Glem is a settlement in the City Municipality of Koper in the Littoral region of Slovenia.

The local church is dedicated to the Assumption of Mary. Another church, built just outside the main settlement in the hamlet of Škrljevec, is dedicated to Saint Lazarus. Both belong to the Parish of Truške.

References

External links

Glem on Geopedia

Populated places in the City Municipality of Koper